College of Engineering, Pathanapuram (Malayalam: പത്തനാപുരം എഞ്ചിനീയറിംഗ് കോളേജ്) was established in 2011.
It is one of the fourteen Professional institution under the Co-operative Academy of Professional Education (CAPE Kerala). established by Government of Kerala.

The AICTE (All India Council for Technical Education) has given approval for the conduct of the courses. The state government has sanctioned four B.Tech degree courses, and the A P J Abdul Kalam Technological University has academically accredited it.

History 
Started in 2011. First published around 2000.

Affiliated University 

The Institution was affiliated to Cochin University of Science and Technology (CUSAT) but has recently changed its affiliation to a relatively new university called  A P J Abdul Kalam Technological University, formerly known as Kerala Technological University (KTU).

Admission 
Admission is made as per the rank obtained by eligible candidates in the state-level Common Entrance Exam (KEAM) conducted by the Commissioner for Entrance Examination(CEE). 15% of the sanctioned intake of students in each course are available for admission to NRI quota seats, in which the admissions are made by the college. The Engineering Diploma holders are admitted directly to the 3rd semester by Lateral entry Scheme.

Location 
The College is located at Elikkatoor, near Piravanthoor junction on the side of Punalur-Muvattupuzha road (between Punalur and Pathanapuram) which is 7 km from Punalur and 8 km from Pathanapuram.

Courses Offered 

The Institution offers B.Tech courses in

 Civil Engineering (60 Seats),
 Computer Science & Engineering (60 Seats). 
 Electrical and Electronics Engineering (60 Seats),
 Electronics and Communication Engineering (60 Seats),
Mechanical engineering(60 Seats).
POLYTECNIC .

See also 
 A P J Abdul Kalam Technological University
 List of Engineering Colleges in Kerala

References

External links 
 Official Website 
 Facebook Page 
 CAPE Kerala 

Engineering colleges in Kollam district
Educational institutions established in 2011
2011 establishments in Kerala